The International Panel of ICC Umpires was established by the ICC in 1994 following trial in 1992/3, to ensure that one neutral umpire would stand in every Test match. It is made up of officials nominated from each of the twelve Test playing cricket boards. From 2002, its role in Tests was largely supplanted by the Elite Panel of ICC Umpires.

Umpires from the International Panel are employed to officiate home One Day international matches, but may also be called upon to aid the Elite Panel in Test matches and overseas ODIs during busy cricketing calendar years.

Current panel
, the ICC International Panel consisted of:

Previous panel
The original members of the International Panel in 1994 were:

See also
Umpire (cricket)
Elite Panel of ICC Umpires
Elite Panel of ICC Referees
List of Test umpires

References

Cricket umpiring
U
Sports organizations established in 1994